Heimarmene or Himarmene  is a goddess and being of fate/destiny in Greek mythology (in particular, the orderly succession of cause and effect, or rather, the fate of the universe as a whole, as opposed to the destinies of individual people). She belongs to a family of similar beings of destiny and fate, which have given us various modern concepts (such as Aesa, Moira, Moros, Ananke, Adrasteia and Pepromene).

Etymology
Heimarmene's name is an ontological description of how she was seen. It is speculated to be a participial form of the Greek verb  (meiresthai, meaning "to receive as one's lot"), which is derived from the same root as Moira ("fate"). It is likely that both are correct.

Other uses
The term "Heimarmene" (personified or not) is also widely used in the Greek Stoic tradition, the Gnostic religion (such as in the Pistis Sophia manuscript), and other obscure religious sects.

External links

Cosmology of the Stoa
Smith, Dictionary of Greek and Roman Biography and Mythology, v. 2, page 370
Greek and Roman religion: a source book
Physics of the Stoics, by Samuel Sambursky
In works of Josephus

Greek gods
Greek goddesses
Personifications in Greek mythology